Sainte-Jeanne-d'Arc, Ste-Jeanne-d'Arc, or variation, may refer to various places or buildings:

People
 Joan of Arc, who is known as Sainte Jeanne d'Arc (Ste. Jeanne d'Arc) in her native French

Places
 Sainte-Jeanne-d'Arc, Bas-Saint-Laurent, Quebec, a parish municipality in Quebec
 Sainte-Jeanne-d'Arc, Saguenay–Lac-Saint-Jean, Quebec, a village in Quebec

Churches
 Basilica of Sainte-Jeanne-d'Arc (Paris)
 Sainte Jeanne d'Arc Church (Besançon)
 Sainte Jeanne d'Arc Church (Nice)

See also
 Jeanne (disambiguation)
 Joan of Arc (disambiguation)
 Jeanne d'Arc (disambiguation)
 Saint (disambiguation)
 Arc (disambiguation)